Leesa Gazi (born 14 August 1969) is a Bangladeshi-born British writer, playwright, theatre director and actress based in London.

Background
Gazi's father fought during the Bangladesh Liberation War.

Career
Gazi is the co-founder of theatre and arts company, Komola Collective. She was the script-writer and performer of Six Seasons and Tahmima Anam's A Golden Age at the Southbank Centre. Her theatrical credits include: Birangona: Women of War, Sonata, Rokey's Dream, Demon's Revenge, Ponderful People, and Bonbibi. She also wrote the script for Bonbibi: Lady of the Forest in 2012. She performed in People's Romeo, which had an eight-week nationwide tour with Tara Arts. Sonata, adapted and performed by Gazi, was invited to Bangladesh in 2010 by the British Council. She performed in a serialised adaptation of A Golden Age. She worked as the cultural coordinator and as a voice artist for Akram Khan's Desh.

In 2012, she worked as a script interpreter Globe to Globe Festival at the Globe Theatre on The Tempest. She acted on a play about domestic violence called Whisper Me Happy Ever After. She works for Train4change as an actor as well, and worked on a project with them on a film for the charity WaterAid. Between May and August 2014, she worked as an actor in a series of BBC Educational Films.

Gazi hosts Aei Jonopode, a weekly live-phone-in show on Bangla TV. In 2010, her first novel Rourob was published.

Gazi was awarded the Grants for the Arts by the ACE for the Birangona: Women of War theatre project by Komola Collective. She is the concept developer, co-writer and the performer of this theatre production.

In May 2014, Gazi was interviewed by Nadia Ali on BBC Asian Network.

Personal life
Gazi and her husband, have two children; one born 2004 (named Sreya), the other 2006 (named Orion).

Filmography

Film

Stage

See also
 British Bangladeshi
 List of British Bangladeshis

References

External links

Leesa Gazi on The Huffington Post
Komola Collective website

1969 births
Living people
British Muslims
Bangladeshi expatriates in the United Kingdom
British people of Bangladeshi descent
Bangladeshi stage actresses
British stage actresses
Bangladeshi film actresses
British film actresses
Bangladeshi theatre directors
British theatre directors
British women dramatists and playwrights
21st-century Bangladeshi women writers
British television presenters
British actresses of South Asian descent
21st-century British actresses
British Asian writers
21st-century British writers
21st-century British women writers
Actresses from London
British women television presenters
Bangladeshi women television presenters
21st-century English women
21st-century English people